Roger McIntyre is a retired Scottish curler who was on a European Curling Championships winning team. His career spanned from 1981 to 1995.

References

External links

Scottish male curlers
Curlers at the 1992 Winter Olympics
Continental Cup of Curling participants
Living people
European curling champions
Year of birth missing (living people)
Place of birth missing (living people)
20th-century Scottish people